The 1973 Constitution or the Constitution of 1973 may refer to

 A Constitution of Bahrain
 The present Constitution of Pakistan
 An historical Constitution of the Philippines